Philippine Research Institute may refer to:
Philippine Rice Research Institute
Philippine Nuclear Research Institute